"Unknown Number" is a science fiction short story by Blue Neustifter. It was first published as a thread on Twitter, in 2021.

Synopsis
Rather than being a standard narrative, the story is told as a series of text messages between Gaby — a trans woman — and a version of herself from a parallel universe where she never transitioned.

Reception
"Unknown Number" was nominated for the 2022 Hugo Award for Best Short Story.

CBC.ca described it as "intimate and moving".

References

External links
First post of the thread containing the story

2021 short stories
Short stories about parallel universes
Twitter
Transgender literature
2020s LGBT literature
LGBT speculative fiction
LGBT short stories